Zakspeed is a motor racing team from Germany, founded in 1968 by Erich Zakowski and after that run by his son Peter Zakowski.

1973 to 1981: Saloon and sports car racing
In the late 1970s, Zakspeed was the official Ford team in the German Deutsche Rennsport Meisterschaft (DRM) series, a predecessor of the current DTM. The company constructed and entered an FIA Group 2 Escort and the Group 5 Capri, based on the MKIII production model. During this period, the Zakspeed team achieved a number of victories including the overall championship in 1981 with driver Klaus Ludwig.

In the early 1980s, Zakspeed also prepared a Mustang for Ford USA's Special Vehicle Operations to race in the domestic IMSA Camel GT series. The Mustang chassis was based on the Group 5 Capri.

1982 to 1989: Endurance cars and F1

In 1982, Zakspeed ran the works Ford C100 Group C effort in conjunction with the factory. The Zakspeed-prepared machine was run by the works Ford Germany team with Klaus Ludwig, Manfred Winkelhock and Marc Surer at the wheel, but the car was a midfielder at best, although Jonathan Palmer and Desiré Wilson scored a 4th place overall the 1000 km of Brands Hatch in 1982. Ford Germany retracted their support and one car was sold to privateers, while the other chassis was evolved by Zakspeed into the C1/4 and the C1/8, making few appearances in international racing, but becoming a front-runner in the German Interserie, where it won the championship in 1984 with Klaus Niedzwiedz.

The engine was the basis for their Formula One entry from 1985 to 1988. In spite of the team's engineering expertise, Zakspeed never managed to create a competitive chassis/engine package. Their first car, the 184, debuted in 1985, one year after the original plan, and was already outdated. Even with drivers such as the first Formula 3000 champion Christian Danner and ex-Tyrrell driver Martin Brundle, their best result (and only points finish) was a 5th place in the 1987 San Marino Grand Prix, thanks to Brundle.

For their final season, in 1989, they had to use Yamaha engines as turbos were banned. The Japanese engine was unreliable and drivers Bernd Schneider (former German Formula 3 champion) and the rookie Aguri Suzuki struggled to pre-qualify the car. Schneider only qualified the car twice and retired both times, while Suzuki never got past pre-qualifying. In the end, Zakspeed were notable for building their own chassis and engine, something only Ferrari did at that time, but with no competitive showings in five years, the team left Formula One and returned to touring cars, where they had once been at the top of the game.

1990s and beyond: Return to sports and touring cars
After withdrawing from F1, they ran Mercedes 190E and Opel Calibra cars in the 1990s Deutsche Tourenwagen Meisterschaft and the short-lived ITC series, now managed by Peter Zakowski who had taken over from his father after his Formula 3 career. His career as a driver did not lead him into F1, but he was quick around the old Nürburgring Nordschleife circuit in endurance races, winning the 24 Hours Nürburgring several times.

In 1998, Zakspeed entered two Porsche 911 GT1 in the FIA GT Championship, where French Team Oreca dominated the GT2-class with their heavily modified Chrysler Viper GTS-Rs. One of these Vipers was purchased by Zakspeed to be entered on the Nürburgring VLN series to take advantage of the new, less restrictive rules for the 1999 season. Zakowski and his teammate dominated the 1999 season, winning every race, before the rules were altered for 2000 and the Porsche 996 GT3 showed up. The team won the 24 Hours Nürburgring again in 2001 and 2002. In 2003, against factory competition, they were disqualified due to a dispute over fuel tank size.

A company related to Zakspeed, Nitec, built the NASCAR-like V8-powered tube frame prototype cars of the V8Star Series Championship series which ran from 2001 to 2003. These identical cars used bodies modelled after road cars from Jaguar, BMW, Opel, Lexus and others. Zakspeed itself won in 2003 with Pedro Lamy in a Jaguar-bodied car.

In 2001, the Zakspeed team also made a brief return to single-seaters with a foray into CART racing in the US in partnership with the long-established Forsythe Championship Racing. Nobody from Zakspeed came over to the U.S. and Forsythe ended the partnership.

In 2006, the Zakspeed team returned to the FIA GT Championship with the Saleen S7-R. Currently, the company also runs a racing school operating at the Nürburgring circuit.

Superleague Formula
In 2008, Zakspeed managed the Superleague Formula cars of Borussia Dortmund and Beijing Guoan, with the latter taking the overall title from such clubs as PSV Eindhoven, Liverpool F.C. and A.C. Milan. Dortmund took one win in the season and Beijing took three on the way to the title with driver Davide Rigon.

In 2009, Zakspeed managed Sporting CP (who won a race with Pedro Petiz) and R.S.C. Anderlecht.

Gallery

Complete Formula One World Championship results
(key) (results in bold indicate pole position)

References

External links

Zakspeed Formula One History and Team Record
Profile of the highly successful Zakspeed-built Group 5 racing Capri
Article on Zakspeed's partnership with Yamaha (archived from the original)

 
German auto racing teams
German racecar constructors
1968 establishments in Germany
Formula One entrants
Formula One engine manufacturers
24 Hours of Le Mans teams
FIA GT Championship teams
Superleague Formula teams
Deutsche Tourenwagen Masters teams
ADAC GT Masters teams
Engine manufacturers of Germany
German Formula 3 teams
Blancpain Endurance Series teams
World Sportscar Championship teams
Auto racing teams established in 1968